Lauderdale County School District or Lauderdale County Schools is a school district headquartered in Ripley, Tennessee.

All parts of Lauderdale County are in the school district.

Schools
 High schools
 Halls High School
 Ripley High School
 Middle/junior high schools
 Halls Junior High School
 Ripley Middle School
 Elementary schools
  Halls Elementary School
 Ripley Elementary School
 Ripley Primary School
 Alternative school
 Alternative Learning Academy

References

External links
 
Lauderdale County, Tennessee
School districts in Tennessee